Kearns High School is a public high school located at 5525 S. Cougar Lane (4800 W.) Kearns, Utah, United States. It was opened in 1966 with its first graduating class graduating in 1967.  It serves 9th, 10th, 11th and 12th grade students. The official mascot is a Cougar and the school colors are green and gold. Starting with the 2014–2015 school year, the school now serves 9th grade. At the 2021 graduation ceremony, Kearns High School officials withheld a student's diploma and subsequently charged her $5,000 because a guest popped confetti in celebration when the student's name was called.

iCougars
For the 2010–11 school year, Kearns High School used the  Initiative with money from a federal stimulus Enhancing Education Through Technology grant. The media specialist, Rachel Murphy, wrote the grant to start the program. The  program began on November 5, 2010, and had each student use an iPod Touch to keep track of assignments, take notes, learn different languages, and do research. Kearns High School was the first school of its size to use the  Initiative.

Administration
 Principal - Danny Stirland
 Assistant Principal - Brett Hansen
 Assistant Principal - Jeremy Smith
 Assistant Principal - Sarah Wall
 Assistant Principal - Scott Wooldridge
 Principals' Secretary - Jeri Maples
 Bookkeeper - Erin Winkler
 Athletic Directors - Dave Ballard and Emily Williams

Gates Field
Gates Field is the baseball stadium on the campus of Kearns. Gates field seats 2,500 and is one of, if not the, biggest high school baseball stadiums in Utah. Notable features include plaques located above the dugouts with famous quotes said by Babe Ruth and Ernie Banks engraved on them. The stadium opened in 2005, and continues to act as a host site for Utah high school state championships and other tournaments.

COVID-19 school cancellation
On March 13, 2020, Granite School District announced that in-person classes at Kearns High School and other schools within the district would be cancelled until further notice due to the COVID-19 pandemic. The rest of the 2019–20 school year took place via distance learning. For the 2020–21 school year, students will have the option to either attend class in-person or receive schooling through digital learning methods.

Notable alumni
 Brandon Duckworth, baseball player
 DaMarques Johnson, professional Mixed Martial Artist, formerly with the UFC
 Gary Padjen, former NFL player
 Sim Gill, Salt Lake County District Attorney

References

External links

 Official webpage
 Alternative webpage

Public high schools in Utah
Educational institutions established in 1966
Schools in Salt Lake County, Utah
1966 establishments in Utah